Mizan is an Arabic word and an Islamic concept.

Mizan may also refer to:
 Mizan (treatise), a treatise on the contents of Islam, written by the Pakistani Islamic scholar Javed Ahmad Ghamidi.
 Mizan, Iran, a village
 Mizan (Dogu'a Tembien), a municipality in Ethiopia
 Tafsir al-Mizan, a quranic tafsir by Ayatollah Sayyid Muhammad Hussein Tabataba'i
 Mizan (newspaper), a newspaper published in Iran between 1980 and 1981
 Mizan (weekly newspaper), an Ottoman newspaper
 Al-Mizan Charitable Trust, a charity in the UK

People
 Mizan (musician), Ethiopian singer
 Mizan Mehari (1980–2007), Australian athlete
 Mizan Rahman, (1932–2015), Bangladeshi Canadian mathematician and writer
 Mizan Zainal Abidin of Terengganu (born 1962), Malaysian sultan

ar:ميزان